Holy Souls or Holy Soul may mean:
 All Souls (disambiguation), in particular
 Church penitent, souls in Purgatory
 Society of the Helpers of the Holy Souls
 Church of the Holy Souls in Purgatory (Alcamo)
 The Holy Soul Australian rock 'n' roll band

See also
 Our Lady of Ransom and the Holy Souls Church, Llandrindod Wells